Home Colony was an anarchist colony on Puget Sound in Washington State from 1898 to 1909. Its founders were members of a former Bellamyite colony who bought 26 acres and formally organized as the Mutual Home Association in January 1898. Colonists purchased one or two acres and the proceeds purchased new land for the colony. Its colonists lived as individuals rather than cooperatively and tolerated a wide degree of social practices, including free love, free speech. They organized few cooperative institutions aside from a cooperative store (1902), some mutual construction projects, and a weekly anarchist paper, Discontent: Mother of Progress. When the newspaper was fined for obscenity, they replaced it with The Demonstrator. The original 40 colonists grew to 91 by 1900 and 155 by 1906. The colony's numerous visiting speakers included Emma Goldman. Following 1909 changes to the association's articles of incorporation allowed land to transfer from their mutual trust to private ownership, Home declined as a cooperative community but remained a home for anarchists.

References

Bibliography

External links 

 Photograph archive at the University of Washington Libraries
 Digitized newspaper archives at Washington State University

1898 establishments in Washington (state)
Anarchist intentional communities
Intentional communities in the United States